Xinzhuang can refer to the following locations:

Mainland China 
Xinzhuang Station (Shanghai Metro)

Towns
Xinzhuang, Shanghai (莘庄镇), town in Minhang District
Xinzhuang Subdistrict (新庄街道), Yixing, Jiangsu

Written as "辛庄镇":
Xinzhuang, Changshu, Jiangsu
Xinzhuang, Laiwu, in Laicheng District, Laiwu, Shandong
Xinzhuang, Yantai, in Zhaoyuan, Shandong
Xinzhuang, Tianjin, in Jinnan District

Written as "新庄镇":
Xinzhuang, Anhui, in Xiao County
Xinzhuang, Ning County, Gansu
Xinzhuang, Suqian, in Suyu District, Suqian, Jiangsu
Xinzhuang, Jiangxi, in Yifeng County
Xinzhuang, Jilin, in Yushu
Xinzhuang, Qinghai, in Datong Hui and Monguor Autonomous County
Xinzhuang, Fei County, Shandong

Townships
Written as "新庄乡":
Xinzhuang Township, Hezheng County, Gansu
Xinzhuang Township, Huining County, Gansu

Written as "辛庄乡"
Xinzhuang Township, Gucheng County, Hebei
Xinzhuang Township, Jingxing County, Hebei
Xinzhuang Township, Henan, in Fan County

Taiwan 
Xinzhuang District (新莊區), New Taipei
Xinzhuang, Zuoying (spelled as Sinjhuang by local government), subregion of Zuoying District, Kaohsiung
Xinzhuang Station (Taipei Metro), a metro station in New Taipei